Fariyaad is a 1942 Bollywood film directed by Jayant Desai and starring Shamim, Mubarak, Ishwarlal, Rama Shukul and Noor Jehan. The film was made for producer Chandulal Shah's Ranjit Studios.

Cast
 Shamim Bano
 Ishwarlal
 Noor Jehan
 Rama Shukul
 Mubarak

Soundtrack
The film had lyrics written by D. N. Madhok and music was composed by Khemchand Prakash. The songs were sung by Shamim, Ishwarlal, Rajkumari and Binapani Mukherjee.

Song List

References

External links
 

1942 films
1940s Hindi-language films
Films scored by Khemchand Prakash
Indian black-and-white films
Films directed by Jayant Desai